The politics of Zhejiang Province in the People's Republic of China is structured in a dual party-government system like all other governing institutions in mainland China.

The Governor of Zhejiang is the highest-ranking official in the People's Government of Zhejiang. However, in the province's dual party-government governing system, the Governor has less power than the Zhejiang Chinese Communist Party (CCP) Provincial Committee Secretary, colloquially termed the "Zhejiang CCP Party Chief".

Provincial-level leaders

Secretaries of the Communist Party Zhejiang Committee 

Tan Zhenlin (谭震林): May 1949 – September 1952
Tan Qilong (谭启龙): September 1952 – August 1954
Jiang Hua: August 1954 – January 1967
Nan Ping (南萍): March 1968 – May 1973
Tan Qilong (谭启龙): May 1973 – February 1977
Tie Ying (铁瑛): February 1977 – March 1983
Wang Fang (王芳): March 1983 – March 1987
Xue Ju (薛驹): March 1987 – December 1988
Li Zemin (李泽民): December 1988 – September 1998
Zhang Dejiang (张德江): September 1998 – November 2002
Xi Jinping (习近平): November 2002 – March 2007
Zhao Hongzhu (赵洪祝): March 2007 – December 2012
Xia Baolong (夏宝龙): December 2012 – April 2017
Che Jun (车俊): April 2017 – September 2020
Yuan Jiajun (袁家军): September 2020 – December 2022
Yi Lianhong (易炼红): December 2022 - present

Governors of Zhejiang 
Tan Zhenlin: August 1949 – January 1955
Sha Wenhan (沙文汉): January 1955 – November 1957
Huo Shilian (霍士廉): November 1957 – January 1958
Zhou Jianren (周建人): January 1958 – 1966
Nan Ping (南萍): March 1968 – May 1973
Tan Qilong: May 1973 – February 1977
Tie Ying (铁瑛): February 1977 – December 1979
Li Fengping (李丰平): December 1979 – April 1983
Xue Ju (薛驹): April 1983 – January 1988
Shen Zulun (沈祖伦): February 1988 – November 1990
Ge Hongsheng (葛洪升): November 1990 – March 1991
Wan Xueyuan (万学远): March 1991 – April 1997
Chai Songyue (柴松岳): April 1997 – October 2002
Xi Jinping (习近平): October 2002－January 2003
Lü Zushan (吕祖善): January 2003－August 2011
Xia Baolong (夏宝龙): August 2011 － December 2012
Li Qiang (李强): December 2012 － June 2016
Che Jun (车俊): July 2016 － April 2017
Yuan Jiajun (袁家军): April 2017 － September 2020
Zheng Shanjie (郑栅洁): September 2020 － September 2021
Wang Hao (王浩): September 2021 － present

Directors of the Zhejiang Provincial People's Congress 
Tie Ying (铁瑛): 1979–1983
Li Fengping (李丰平): 1983–1988
Chen Anyu (陈安羽): 1988–1993
Li Zemin (李泽民): 1993–2003
Xi Jinping (习近平): 2003–2007
Yu Guoxing (俞国行): 2007 – January 2008
Zhao Hongzhu (赵洪祝): January 2008 – 2013
Xia Baolong (夏宝龙): 2013–2017
Che Jun (车俊): 2017 – September 2020
Yuan Jiajun (袁家军): September 2020 – present

Chairperson of CPPCC Zhejiang Committee 
Tan Zhenlin (谭震林): 1950–1952
Tan Qilong (谭启龙): 1952–1955
Jiang Hua (江华): 1955–1967
Tie Ying (铁瑛): 1977–1979
Mao Qihua (毛齐华): 1979–1983
Wang Jiayang (王家扬): 1983–1988
Shang Jingcai (商景才): 1988–1993
Liu Feng (刘枫): 1993–2003
Li Jiming (李金明): 2003–2007
Zhou Guofu (周国富): 2007–2013
Qiao Chuanxiu (乔传秀): 2013–2018
Ge Huijun (葛慧君): 2018–2022
Huang Lixin (黄莉新): 2022–present

See also
New Zhijiang Army

Zhejiang
Zhejiang
Zhejiang